Edwin A. Stevens Hall is located in Hoboken, Hudson County, New Jersey, United States. The building was added to the National Register of Historic Places on February 4, 1994. The building was designed by Richard Upjohn and built in 1870. The building was named after Edwin Augustus Stevens and used as the main building for the Stevens Institute of Technology. The renowned DeBaun Auditorium, which is over 100 years old, is located in this building. The building is currently used as the Charles V. Schaefer, Jr. School of Engineering and Science.

See also
National Register of Historic Places listings in Hudson County, New Jersey

References

Buildings and structures in Hoboken, New Jersey
University and college buildings on the National Register of Historic Places in New Jersey
School buildings completed in 1870
National Register of Historic Places in Hudson County, New Jersey
New Jersey Register of Historic Places